The Bar B Formation is a geologic formation found the Caballo Mountains of New Mexico. It preserves fossils showing it was deposited in the middle to late Pennsylvanian.

Description
The Bar B formation is mostly cyclic beds of shale and limestone, with shale making up about 80% of the formation and limestone the other 20%. Chert is present in some of the limestone. The upper  include reddish-brown siltstone, limestone conglomerate, and calcareous siltstone. The formation rests on the Nakaye Formation and is unconformably overlain by the Bursum Formation.

The formation likely correlates with the Panther Seep Formation in the San Andres Mountains.

Fossils
The formation contains abundant bryozoan fossils.

History of investigation
The formation was first defined by V.C.Kelley and Caswell Silver in 1952. Bachman and Myers criticized its definition in 1975, but it is accepted by Kues and Giles, though they restrict it to the Caballo Mountains.

See also

 List of fossiliferous stratigraphic units in New Mexico
 Paleontology in New Mexico

References

Carboniferous formations of New Mexico
Carboniferous southern paleotropical deposits